Ziplock may refer to:

 Ziploc, a brand of reusable, re-sealable zipper storage bags and containers
 Ziplock (song), a song by Gwen Stefani
 "Ziplock", a song by Ice-T
 Zip-Lock (song), a song by the American pop punk band Lit